Interstate 459 (I-459) is a bypass highway of I-59 that is an alternate Interstate Highway around the southern sides of Birmingham, Bessemer, and several other cities and towns in Jefferson County, Alabama. I-459 lies entirely within Jefferson County. I-459 has major interchanges with I-59, I-20, and I-65.

Route description
I-459 begins at a trumpet interchange with I-20/I-59 near Bessemer and McCalla. Exit 1, an interchange with Eastern Valley Road, provides access to the large Colonial Promenade shopping center and McCalla community. The freeway then passes under Pocahontas Road and next to the Bent Brook Golf Club before intersecting with Morgan Road at exit 6. Morgan Road connects with Bessemer, Helena, and the western fringes of Hoover along with the Bessemer Airport. After Morgan Road, I-459 enters a much more populated and developed area, namely the large suburb of Hoover. Once interchanging with State Route 150 (SR 150) at exit 10, the highway turns northeastward and widens to 10 lanes. Exit 13 is with US 31, a major suburban route through Hoover, Vestavia Hills, and Pelham. A southbound flyover ramp at this interchange provides direct access to the Riverchase Galleria. The freeway then approaches its interchange with I-65, one of two four-level stack interchanges in the state (the other being its interchange with I-20). After the I-65 interchange, the roadway decreases to six lanes and has a minor interchange with Acton Road at exit 17. As it exits Hoover, I-459 intersects with US 280, an 8- to 10-lane suburban arterial that is one of the most congested roads in Greater Birmingham. The area around this interchange contains many hotels and office buildings. After the US 280 interchange, it turns north and enters a residential area along the Cahaba River, crossing the river twice before passing the "Miss Liberty" (Statue of Liberty replica) and the exit 23 interchange with Liberty Parkway and Overton Road. The highway passes east of Mountain Brook while turning northeast and interchanging with Grants Mill Road at exit 27. After this intersection, I-459 turns northward again as it approaches the suburb of Trussville. The interchange with I-20 is one of two stack interchanges in Greater Birmingham. In its last few miles, the highway intersects with Derby Parkway and US 11 in Trussville before completing its  course with an interchange at I-59.

Future

An additional interchange for I-459
Negotiations between the Alabama Department of Transportation (ALDOT) and the city of Hoover are continuing regarding the prospective building of an additional interchange for I-459 at South Shades Crest Road, a heavily traveled traffic artery. An exit here would relieve some of the traffic congestion on SR 150. No firm plans have been announced for construction of this interchange.

Northern bypass
There are plans to construct another Interstate Highway bypass running north of the Birmingham area to provide another Interstate Highway that would have major interchanges with I-59 (two), I-20 (one), I-65 (one), and the newly constructed I-22, with all of these interchanges being either north or west of Birmingham. This new bypass route has been tentatively numbered as Interstate 422. When this northern bypass of the urban area is built, it would give Birmingham and Jefferson County a completely ringed Interstate bypass.

Exit list

See also

References

59-4 Alabama
59-4
Bypasses in Alabama
4
Transportation in Jefferson County, Alabama